The vice president of the Abkhaz Republic, a partially recognized state, internationally regarded as a part of Georgia, is the first in the presidential line of succession, becoming the new president of Abkhazia upon the death, resignation, or removal of the president. Additionally, the vice president would assume the presidency in case the president becomes incapable of carrying out the presidential duties.

Eligibility
According to the article 54 of the Constitution of Abkhazia, a citizen of Abkhazia, no younger than 35 years old and no older than 65 years old, who is in possession of suffrage, may be elected vice president. The vice president shall not be member of the Parliament, or hold any other offices in state or public bodies as well as in businesses.

Election
The vice president is elected simultaneously with the president. A candidate for vice president is nominated by a candidate for president.

Duties
The vice president executes individual assignments on a commission of the president and acts for the president in his absence or in case when it is impossible for the president to attend to his duties.

List of vice presidents of Abkhazia

See also
President of Abkhazia
Prime Minister of Abkhazia
Minister for Foreign Affairs of Abkhazia

References

External links
President of the Republic of Abkhazia. Official site

Politics of Abkhazia
Abkhazia